Animals is a 2017 Austrian / Swiss / Polish mystery film directed by Greg Zglinski.

Cast 
 Birgit Minichmayr - Anna
 Philipp Hochmair - Nick
  - Mischa
 Mehdi Nebbou - Tarek
 Michael Ostrowski - Harald

References

External links 

2010s mystery films
Austrian mystery films
Swiss mystery films
Polish mystery films
2010s German-language films